Agrotis venerabilis, the dusky cutworm, is a moth of the family Noctuidae. The species was first described by Francis Walker in 1857. It is found from coast to coast from central Canada south to Mexico.

The wingspan is about 37 mm. Adults are on wing from August to September in temperate climes within their range. They have a much wider season in the Neotropics, starting at least as early as March.

The larvae feed on Medicago sativa, Trifolium, Nicotiana tabacum, Viola, Stellaria media, Avena sativa and Zea mays.

Subspecies
Agrotis venerabilis venerabilis
Agrotis venerabilis arida

External links

"Agrotis venerabilis Walker 1857". Moths of North Dakota. Retrieved November 14, 2020.

Agrotis
Moths of North America
Moths described in 1857